Machagai is a city in Chaco Province, Argentina. It is the head town of the Veinticinco de Mayo Department.

Toponimy 
In the Qom language "Machagai" means "lowland", referring to its geographical features as a slope near rivers like the Bermejo and Paraná.

History 
Native Argentines like the Qom people used to wander through the area, giving the place its name. After the end of the Argentine Civil War, the government turned its attention to scarcely populated regions of the country like Patagonia and Chaco, and started to promote the arrival of immigrants to populate and strengthen them. The province of Chaco was one of the most transformed by this wave of immigration. In 1909 the first Serbian immigrants from the Austro-Hungarian Empire came to Machagai and founded their agricultural colonies, in 1921 by State decree it was promoted to the category of town. Until the mid 20th century, Machagai continued to receive immigrants from Yugoslavia and Spain.

References

External links

Populated places in Chaco Province